The women's junior singles is one of the events at the annual Bowls England National Championships.

Past winners

References

Bowls in England